The Better Half is a 1918 American silent drama film directed by John S. Robertson and starring Alice Brady, David Powell and Crauford Kent.

Plot summary 
Louise and Trixie Thorley are twins, one is kind-hearted and the other selfish. Although Louise loves Michael Thwaite, he is dazzled by the pampered Trixie and marries her. Trixie soon tires of Michael and departs for Europe with Hendrick Thurston, "an idler." The night she leaves him, Michael is attacked by thugs and loses his sight. To spare his feelings, Louise tends to him posing as Trixie. When Trixie returns, the twins argue, and Trixie kills herself in a fit of remorse. Michael finally regains his sight and, realizing Louise's love, marries her.

Cast
 Alice Brady as 	Louise / Beatrix Thorley 
 David Powell as 	Michael Thwaite
 Crauford Kent as 	Hendrick Thurston
 William T. Carleton as Judge Thorley
 Isabel O'Madigan as 	Mrs. Corlandt
 Richard Allen as Doctor

References

Bibliography
 Connelly, Robert B. The Silents: Silent Feature Films, 1910-36, Volume 40, Issue 2. December Press, 1998.
 Munden, Kenneth White. The American Film Institute Catalog of Motion Pictures Produced in the United States, Part 1. University of California Press, 1997.

External links
 

1918 films
1918 drama films
1910s English-language films
American silent feature films
Silent American drama films
American black-and-white films
Films directed by John S. Robertson
Selznick Pictures films
1910s American films